Penn Yan Historic District is a national historic district located at Penn Yan in Yates County, New York. It includes a broad range of architecturally significant resources that document the village's development from the 1820s to 1929. It includes representative examples of residential, commercial, industrial, civic, and ecclesiastical structures. Highlights include the Birkett Mills, the Chronicle Building, Knapp Hotel, and the Castner House. Located within the boundaries of the district are the separately listed Yates County Courthouse Park District and the U.S. Post Office building (1912–1913).

It was listed on the National Register of Historic Places in 1985.

Gallery

References

Historic districts on the National Register of Historic Places in New York (state)
Georgian architecture in New York (state)
Historic districts in Yates County, New York
National Register of Historic Places in Yates County, New York